Vilma Jamnická (née Vilma Březinová) (13 November 1906 – 12 August 2008) was a Czechoslovak actress, astrologer and astrological writer.

Life
Jamnická was born in Barchov in 1906, which was then part of the Austria-Hungary (now in the Czech Republic). She died in Bratislava, Slovakia on 12 August 2008, at the age of 101.

Filmography
 1954 – Drevená dedina
 1958 – V hodine dvanástej
 1962/1963 – Jánošík I-II (blind old woman)
 1971 – Keby som mal pušku (Marina)
 1971 – Páni sa zabávajú (Deminová)
 1974 – Kto odchádza v daždi (Križanová)
 1977 – Biela stužka v tvojich vlasoch (Kucková)
 1979 – Kamarátky (old woman)
 1979 – Postav dom, zasaď strom (old woman Haňa)
 1984 – Na druhom brehu sloboda (Kocianka)
 1985 – Fontána pre Zuzanu (Cilka)
 1985 – Kára plná bolesti (Kráľovná)
 1987 – Hody (Magduša)
 1987 – Vojna volov
 1987 – Strašidla z vikýře (Koutná)
 1988 – Vlakári (babka)
 1992 – Lepšie byť bohatý a zdravý ako chudobný a chorý (Margita)
 1994 – Díky za každé nové ráno (Slavková)
 1997 – Nejasná zpráva o konci světa (old woman)
 2007 – Ordinácia v ružovej záhrade

Books written and titled in Slovak
 Letá a zimy s Jánom Jamnickým (1980)
 Sny a videnia (2001), 
 with Marika Studeničová: Elixír môjho života (2005), 
 with Marika Studeničová: Muž môjho života (2007),

External links

1906 births
2008 deaths
People from Hradec Králové District
People from the Kingdom of Bohemia
20th-century astrologers
Slovak centenarians
Czechoslovak actresses
20th-century Slovak women writers
20th-century Slovak writers
Women centenarians